Tramway is a 1966 short silent film by Polish director Krzysztof Kieślowski, produced while he was a student at the Łódź Film School. The film is included as an extra feature on the American and Artificial Eye Region 2 DVD releases of Kieslowski's A Short Film About Love.

The film shows a boy who sees a girl on a tram as it is leaving. He runs after the tram and finds himself on board alone with the girl. They exchange glances, then she falls asleep against the window. The boy gets off the tram and looks at her through the window, then decides to run after the tram again.

Cast
Jerzy Braszka - boy
Maria Janiec - girl

External links 

Films directed by Krzysztof Kieślowski
1966 films
Polish short films
Polish silent films
Films with screenplays by Krzysztof Kieślowski
Polish black-and-white films